Will Alexander (born 1948) is an American poet, novelist, essayist, playwright, and visual artist. He was the recipient of a Whiting Fellowship for Poetry in 2001 and a California Arts Council Fellowship in 2002.

Life
He earned a BA in English and creative writing from the University of California–Los Angeles in 1972.

He has worked several jobs (including the LA Lakers box office), taught at various institutions, and has been associated with the nonprofit organization Theatre of Hearts/Youth First, working with underserved, at-risk youth.

His work has appeared in BOMB, Boston Review, Entropy, Chicago Review, Denver Quarterly, Fence, jubilat, and The Nation.

Alexander's poetry and his visual art have been greatly influenced by his readings of Bob Kaufman, Octavio Paz, and Francophone Negritude writers such as Aimé Cesaire and Jean-Joseph Rabéarivelo. Alexander describes their themes of cosmic isolation from society and interior discovery as an "alchemical metamorphosis". Much of his work is characterized by this powerful mix of metaphor and sophisticated language.

According to the Poetry Foundation, his work is frequently described as surreal.

Awards
 2016 — Jackson Poetry Prize (awarded by Poets & Writers)
 2014 — American Book Award for Singing In Magnetic Hoofbeat: Essays, Prose, Texts, Interviews, and a Lecture 
 2002 — California Arts Council Fellowship
 2001 — Whiting Fellowship for Poetry

Works
Vertical Rainbow Climber (poems), Jazz Press, 1987.
Arcane Lavender Morals (short fiction chapbook), Leave Books, 1994.
The Stratospheric Canticles (poems), Pantograph Press, 1995. 
Asia & Haiti (two long poems), Sun & Moon Press, 1995. 
Above the Human Nerve Domain (poems), Pavement Saw Press, 1998. 
Towards the Primeval Lightning Field (philosophical essays), O Books, 1998. ; revised second edition published by Litmus Press, 2014. 
Exobiology as Goddess (two long poems), Manifest Press, 2004. 
Sunrise In Armageddon (novel), Spuyten Duyvil Press, 2006. 
Inalienable Recognitions (essays), Tract Series #4. eohippus labs, 2009.
The Sri Lankan Loxodrome (one long and five short poems), New Directions Publishing, 2009. 
On the Substance of Disorder (essays), [Parrot 7]. Insert Press, 2010. 
Compression & Purity (poems), City Lights, 2011. 
Diary As Sin (novel), Skylight Press, 2011. 
Inside the Earthquake Palace: 4 Plays (theatre), Chax Press, 2011. 
Mirach Speaks to his Grammatical Transparents (philosophical essays), Oyster Moon Press, 2011. 
The Brimstone Boat - For Philip Lamantia (long poem from 2000, and essays), Rêve à Deux, 2012. 
Singing in Magnetic Hoofbeat: Essays, Prose Texts, Interviews and a Lecture 1991–2007 (prose anthology), Essay Press, 2012. 
Kaleidoscopic Omniscience: Asia & Haiti/ The Stratospheric Canticles/ Impulse & Nothingness (poetry anthology), Skylight Press, 2012. 
The Transparent as Witness (collaborative prose), Will Alexander & Janice Lee. Solar Luxuriance, 2013.
The Codex Mirror: 60 Drawings by Byron Baker & 60 Writings by Will Alexander (aphorisms), Anon Edition, 2015. 
Based on the Bush of Ghosts (long poem, chapbook), Staging Ground, 2015.
Spectral Hieroglyphics: A Poetic Troika (three long poems), illustrated by Rik Lina. Rêve à Deux, 2016.
Alien Weaving (novella) Anonymous Energy, 2016.
Secrets Prior to the Sun (essay), White Print Inc, 2016.
The Audiographic As Data (collaborative automatic writing), Will Alexander & Carlos Lara. Oyster Moon Press, 2016.
At Night on the Sun (play), Chax Press, 2017.
Colloquy at the Abyss (conversation with Harold Abramowitz), Insert Blanc Press, 2017.
Across the Vapour Gulf (aphorisms), New Directions, 2017.
Phosphenic Threadings (two short prose pieces), Evidence Publications, 2018.
A Cannibal Explains Himself To Himself (essays), The Elephants, 2019.
Dialogics (conversation with Heller Levinson), Concrete Mist Press, 2020.
 The Combustion Cycle (three long poems), Roof Books, 2021.
 Refractive Africa (three long poems), New Directions, 2021. .
 Dialogics Volume 2 (conversation with Heller Levinson), Anvil Tongue Books, 2022.
 The Contortionist Whispers (essays), Action Books, 2022.
 Divine Blue Light (for John Coltrane) (poems), City Lights, 2022. .

References

External links
 Sound recordings of Will Alexander's verse published in the University of Pennsylvania's poetry archive, PennSound
Review of Diary As Sin published in The Prague Post
 Biography at international literature festival berlin

20th-century African-American writers
20th-century American male writers
20th-century American poets
21st-century African-American writers
21st-century American male writers
21st-century American poets
1948 births
African-American male writers
African-American poets
American Book Award winners
American male poets
Living people
PEN Oakland/Josephine Miles Literary Award winners
Poets from California
Surrealist poets